Nigronia fasciata is a megalopterous dark fishfly in the Corydalidae family. The typical size of N. fasciata is 22 to 28 millimeters, or 2.2 to 2.8 centimeters. Range: Eastern United States. Note: not present in Canada.

References

Corydalidae
Insects described in 1975